Shanmuga Industries Arts & Science College (SIASC) was established in 1996 by Shanmuga Industries Educational Trust, Tiruvannamalai

Programs
Shanmuga Industries Arts and Science College offers a variety of courses aimed at educating students about engineering. Courses of study include:

U.G. Courses:-
 B.A., Tamil
 B.A., English
 B.Sc., Mathematics
 B.Sc., Physics
 B.Sc., Chemistry
 B.Sc., Biochemistry
 B.Sc., Biotechnology
 B.Sc., Microbiology
 B.Sc., Electronics Science
 B.Sc., Computer Science
 B.Sc., ISM (Information System Management)
 B.C.A., (Computer Application)
 B.Com., (General)
 B.Com CA., (Computer Application)
 B.Com FA., (Finance & Accounts)
 B.Sc Bio-Technology
 B.B.A., (Business Administration)

P.G Courses
 M.A., Tamil
 M.A., English
 M.Sc., Mathematics
 M.Sc., Physics
 M.Sc., Chemistry
 M.Sc., Microbiology
 M.Sc., Computer Science
 M.C.A., (Approved by AICTE)
 M.Com

M.Phil., Programme
 M.Phil., Tamil
 M.Phil., English
 M.Phil., Mathematics
 M.Phil., Physics
 M.Phil., Computer Science
 M.Phil., Microbiology
 M.Phil., Commerce
 M.Phil., Chemistry *

Ph.D., Programme
 Ph.D., Tamil*
 Ph.D., Physics*
 Ph.D., Chemistry*
 Ph.D., Microbiology
 Ph.D., Commerce

References

External links
 Official Website

Education in Tiruvannamalai district
Tiruvannamalai
Educational institutions established in 1996
1996 establishments in Tamil Nadu
Colleges affiliated to Thiruvalluvar University
Academic institutions formerly affiliated with the University of Madras